St. Paul's Cathedral Mission College, popularly known as St. Paul's College, is an undergraduate liberal arts and sciences college in Kolkata, India. Recently, post-graduate in English literature has been introduced. It is affiliated with the University of Calcutta. It not only boasts of its academic excellence and cordial teacher-student relationship, but also has an eco-friendly campus and quiet surroundings. The college today offers a proper ambience to the students of all religions and creed for full-fledged development of their potentialities. The college is recognized by the University Grants Commission (UGC). Recently, it has been re-accredited and awarded 'B' grade by the National Assessment and Accreditation Council (NAAC).

Notable alumni
Bipin Chandra Pal, freedom fighter 
Bishnu Dey, poet, winner of Sahitya Academy Award
Nirendranath Chakravarty, poet, winner of Sahitya Academy Award
Samit Bhanja, film actor
Anjan Srivastav, film & stage actor
Rishang Keishing, politician, former chief minister of Manipur
Anandamoy Bhattacharjee, former chief justice of the Calcutta and Bombay High Courts
Aurobindo Nath Mukherjee, formerly Bishop of Calcutta and Metropolitan of India, and leader of the Church of India, Pakistan, Burma and Ceylon
Bishnu Prasad Rabha, revolutionary, music composer and singer of Assam
Hokishe Sema, Former Chief Minister of Nagaland and Former Governor of Himachal Pradesh
Radharaman Mitra, revolutionary and Bengali writer
Tarun Majumder, Indian film director. Known for his work in Bengali cinema — Padma Shri awardee, received four National Awards, seven BFJA Awards, five Filmfare Awards and an Anandalok Award.
Tapas Roy, Indian politician. 5 times Member of Legislative Assembly of West Bengal. In 2021 he has won the seat again with a huge public support from Baranagar Assembly Constituency.And he is one of the former ministers of west bengal government from 2018 to 2021.

See also 
List of colleges affiliated to the University of Calcutta
Education in India
Education in West Bengal

References

External links

St. Paul’s Cathedral Mission College

Educational institutions established in 1864
University of Calcutta affiliates
Universities and colleges in Kolkata
Universities and colleges affiliated with the Church of North India
Christian universities and colleges in India
1864 establishments in British India